Thymallus baicalensis, also known as the Baikal black grayling,  is a Siberian freshwater fish species in the salmon family  Salmonidae. 

Thymallus baicalensis occurs in Lake Baikal, in the inflowing Selenga River and throughout the major Enisei River drainage, and also some eastern tributaries of the Ob River.

It was previously considered a subspecies of the Arctic grayling, Thymallus arcticus baicalensis, but currently one of several distinct Siberian and East Asian grayling species, the closest of which are Thymallys nikolskyi, T. svetovidovi, T. brevicephalus  and T. brevirostris. The distinction of these taxa is supported by the phylogeny of their mitochondrial DNA lineages. T. baicalensis is also characterized by a distinct dorsal-fin colouration pattern.

The Baikal grayling can grow up to a length 38 cm and 1.2 kg weight. It mainly moves along stony bottoms at shallow depths, feeding on caddisfly and stonefly larvae, amphipod crustaceans and fish eggs.

References

baicalensis
Freshwater fish of Asia
Fish of Lake Baikal